Habrough railway station serves the village of Habrough and the town of Immingham in North East Lincolnshire, England. It was built by the Great Grimsby and Sheffield Junction Railway in 1848. Up until 1988 there was a signal box at the station on the south side of the track and east side of the road with manually-operated gates. It was of typical Great Central Railway signal box design. The main buildings were located on the eastbound platform and were linked to the westbound one via a footbridge, but both have also been demolished and the level crossing was converted to an AHB (Automatic Half-Barrier) crossing. In 2015/2016, it was converted to a full-barrier level crossing with Obstacle Detection (MCB-OD).

The station is managed by East Midlands Railway, and is also served by Northern Trains and TransPennine Express services.

Facilities
The station is unstaffed and has no ticketing provision, so passengers must buy their tickets in advance or on the train. Other than waiting shelters on each platform, the only amenities provided are a public phone box on platform 1 and timetable information poster boards. Step-free access to both sides is available via the level crossing (the platforms are staggered either side of the crossing).

There is a shop adjacent to the station on the Platform 1 side, which sells hot drinks.

Services
Services at the station are operated by East Midlands Railway, Northern Trains and TransPennine Express.

On Saturdays, there are also three trains per day between Cleethorpes and  via  which are operated by Northern Trains. 

On Sundays, the TransPennine Express service is two-hourly in the morning but increases to hourly in the afternoon. During the summer months, there are three East Midlands Railway services between Nottingham and Cleethorpes and four services to Barton-on-Humber with no services on either of these routes in the winter.

Habrough's railway station is a boundary station for North Lincolnshire and North East Lincolnshire areas. There is no direct passenger service between Barnetby and Ulceby.

References

External links

Railway stations in the Borough of North East Lincolnshire
DfT Category F2 stations
Former Great Central Railway stations
Railway stations in Great Britain opened in 1848
Railway stations served by East Midlands Railway
Northern franchise railway stations
Railway stations served by TransPennine Express